Wells County Courthouse is a historic courthouse located at Bluffton, Wells County, Indiana.  It was designed by architect George W. Bunting and built in 1889.  It is a two-story, Richardsonian Romanesque style sandstone building topped by a high hipped roof.  It has a gable roofed wing and features a four-level corner clock tower and corner turret.

It was listed on the National Register of Historic Places in 1979.

References

County courthouses in Indiana
Clock towers in Indiana
Courthouses on the National Register of Historic Places in Indiana
Richardsonian Romanesque architecture in Indiana
Government buildings completed in 1889
Buildings and structures in Wells County, Indiana
National Register of Historic Places in Wells County, Indiana